Pietroşani may refer to several places:

 Pietroşani, a commune in Argeș County
 Pietroşani, a commune in Teleorman County
 Pietroşani, a village in Puchenii Mari Commune, Prahova County

See also 
 Petroșani, a city in Hunedoara County, Romania
 Piatra (disambiguation)
 Pietriș (disambiguation)
 Pietreni (disambiguation)
 Pietrari (disambiguation)
 Pietrosu (disambiguation)
 Pietrișu (disambiguation)
 Pietroasa (disambiguation)
 Pietricica (disambiguation)